Danielle Jonas (born September 18, 1986) is an American reality television personality, actress, and the founder of the jewelry company Danielle Jonas Co. She is best known for starring on Married to Jonas alongside her husband, musician and actor Kevin Jonas.

Personal life
Danielle Deleasa was born on September 18, 1986, in Denville Township, New Jersey. She has two sisters and one brother. She is of Italian descent. She attended Morris Knolls High School. She worked as a hairdresser before meeting Kevin Jonas. She met Kevin Jonas while both of their families were on vacation in The Bahamas in 2007. They were married on December 19, 2009, at Oheka Castle on Long Island. They have two daughters.

Married to Jonas

Danielle starred in the reality television show Married to Jonas, which was about her marriage to Kevin Jonas, a Jonas Brother. The show debuted in 2012 and ran for two seasons. Danielle's main story line in the first season focused on her tumultuous relationship with her mother-in-law, Denise Jonas.

Business ventures
In late 2013, Jonas and her husband partnered with Dreft to launch an app called Amazing Baby Days that allows couples to capture all of the moments from their pregnancy through the first year of a child's life. She live tweeted the birth of her first daughter as a part of the Dreft partnership.

Jonas founded a jewelry company called Danielle Jonas Co. and launched her first line of jewelry in December 2018 called Moments. The line is based around the concept of birthstones and many of the pieces are named after or inspired by her two daughters. She has said that she has plans to expand the company to include jewelry for children as well as silver pieces (as the collection is currently mostly gold based).

Filmography

Television

Music videos

Awards and nominations

References 

1986 births
Living people
Participants in American reality television series
People from Denville, New Jersey
Jonas family
Female models from New Jersey
American television personalities
American women television personalities
21st-century American businesswomen
21st-century American businesspeople